Signifying Rappers: Rap and Race in the Urban Present is a nonfiction book by Mark Costello and David Foster Wallace. The book explores the music genre's history as it intersected with historical events, either locally and unique to Boston, or in larger cultural or historical contexts.

Title 
The title is based on the track "Signifying Rapper" on the album Smoke Some Kill by Schoolly D. The teasing, taunting, and insulting tradition within African American culture is referred to as "signifyin'", though the word's other meanings are perhaps reflected in Costello and Wallace's title. Henry Louis Gates Jr. has written extensively on the Signifyin (or Signifying) Monkey, its origins and meaning, and how the monkey's attitude and effort to overcome evolved into the "Your motha is so fat" back-and-forth that was part of hip hop's original culture.  The slang of rap, like all slang, may include words that signify others, such as "cut" (turntable technique), "bite" (stealing someone else’s rhymes), "dope" (great), "dawg" (male friend) and such neologisms as "edutainment" (KRS-One) or "raptivist" (Chuck D of Public Enemy), but it is not an important use of the idea of signifying in rap or hip hop.  Signifying in critical theory usage is also meaningful, as signifier in critical theory, and in the linguistic theory of  Ferdinand de Saussure.

Publication history 
The first edition published in late 1990. A second edition was published in 2013, following the death of the first author Wallace, and includes a new preface by second author Mark Costello.
 1990, Ecco Press, 140 pp, .
 2013, Back Bay Books, 176 pp, .

References

External links 
 Signifying Rappers at The Howling Fantods
 My Metonym for Self-Reference Weighs a Ton: When the "resoundingly and in all ways white" David Foster Wallace tried to write about hip-hop., by Mark O'Connell, Slate, Aug. 9, 2013

1990 non-fiction books
Popular culture books
Books by David Foster Wallace
Ecco Press books
Collaborative non-fiction books